St. Alban's Cathedral, located in Prince Albert, Saskatchewan, is the Anglican cathedral of the Diocese of Saskatchewan.

References

External links

St. Alban's
Buildings and structures in Prince Albert, Saskatchewan
Anglican church buildings in Saskatchewan
20th-century Anglican church buildings in Canada